The 1953 Singapore City Council election was the 3rd election to the Singapore City Council. It was held on 5 December 1953 to elect 6 of the 18 seats in the City Council.

Results

By constituency

References 

Singapore City Council elections
1953 in Singapore
Singapore
December 1953 events in Asia